Milcov is a commune in Olt County, Muntenia, Romania. It is composed of four villages: Milcovu din Deal, Milcovu din Vale, Ulmi (the commune center) and Stejaru. It also included Ipotești village until 2004, when it was split off to form a separate commune.

References

Communes in Olt County
Localities in Muntenia